Peter Dietrich (born 6 March 1944 in Neu-Isenburg) is a German former footballer who played as a midfielder.

Dietrich won his lone cap for West Germany straight before the 1970 FIFA World Cup, but did not add any further international match to his tally before his retirement.

References

1944 births
Living people
German footballers
Association football midfielders
Germany international footballers
1970 FIFA World Cup players
Bundesliga players
FC Ingolstadt 04 players
Rot-Weiss Essen players
Borussia Mönchengladbach players
SV Werder Bremen players
People from Neu-Isenburg
Sportspeople from Darmstadt (region)
Footballers from Hesse